John Spencer (18 September 1935 – 11 July 2006) was an English professional snooker player who won the World Snooker Championship title at his first attempt in 1969. He won the Championship title for the second time in 1971, and was the first player to win the championship at the Crucible Theatre when it moved there in 1977.

Spencer was born in Radcliffe, Lancashire. He started national service when he was 18 years old, and did not then play snooker for 11 years. He won the English Amateur Championship in 1966, before turning professional, aged 31, in February 1967. He won over twenty tournaments in all, including three editions of Pot Black. His  included an unusually long backswing which gave him immense , allowing him to develop shots using deep  from long-distance and maximum . He was a snooker commentator for BBC television for 19 years, and chairman of the World Professional Billiards and Snooker Association for seven years. Spencer's later playing career was blighted by the ocular version of myasthenia gravis, with symptoms including double vision. He died in a hospice in Bolton at the age of 70 from the effects of stomach cancer.

Career

Early years and amateur snooker career
John Spencer was born on 18 September 1935 in Radcliffe, Lancashire. He attended Stand Grammar School for Boys in Whitefield. He started playing snooker on a full-sized table at the age of 14, and made his first century break aged 15. He started national service when he was 18 years old, and did not then play snooker for 11 years, taking it up again at the age of 29. In his first tournament after starting to play again, the 1964 English Amateur Snooker Championship, Spencer was runner-up to Ray Reardon, and he lost to Pat Houlihan in the final of the same event in 1965. Spencer lifted the English Amateur trophy in 1966 after an 11–5 victory over Marcus Owen in the final.

Early professional career
Spencer turned professional in February 1967, becoming the first new UK professional since Rex Williams in 1951. Spencer was encouraged to turn professional because of the income he would expect to earn from performing regular exhibition matches for the National Spastics Society—for  a time—and at Pontins holiday camps for a weekly fee of  during the summer holiday season, to be increased to £50 a week the following year.

His amateur rivals, Gary Owen and Reardon, followed suit by turning professional in September and December 1967, respectively. John Pulman had won the professional world title in 1957, and retained it through a series of challenge matches from 1964 to 1968. He had been touring snooker clubs as promotional work for the tobacco brand John Player, and the company had sponsored his 1968 world title challenge match against Eddie Charlton. The good attendances for this match led to John Player's decision to sponsor the 1969 World Championship as a knock-out format tournament. There were eight entrants for the 1969 championship: four of them—Pulman, Williams, Fred Davis, and Jackie Rea—had played professionally since at least the 1950s, while the other four—Spencer, Reardon, Owen, and Bernard Bennett—were championship debutants. He was drawn to meet defending champion Pulman, whom he had recently defeated 17–14 in a non-title challenge match. In November 1968, Spencer eliminated Pulman 25–18 in his opening match, before defeating Williams 37–12 (and 55–18 after completing the ).

The final between Owen and Spencer was held at Victoria Halls, London, from 17 to 22 March 1969. Spencer took a 6–2 lead, before Owen levelled the match at 6–6. The Birmingham Daily Post correspondent praised the players for bringing a "refreshing new look to the game, with bold attacking play, wonderful potting, and a sprinkling of good-sized breaks". On the second day, both players missed easy , sharing the first two frames for 7–7, but Spencer won the next four frames to lead 11–7 by the interval, after which he added four of the subsequent six frames to increase his advantage to six frames at 15–9. The third day's play ended with Spencer still six frames ahead, at 21–15. On the fourth day, Owen closed to 19–23. Spencer then claimed the first three frames of the evening session, and finished the day six frames ahead again at 27–21. At the end of the fifth day, he was one frame from victory at 36–24. Spencer took the first frame on the final day to claim the championship with a winning margin of 37–24. After the remaining 12 dead frames were played, he finished 46–27 ahead. Snooker historian Clive Everton later wrote that: 

In the April 1970 World Championship, Spencer defeated veteran Irish Professional Champion Jackie Rea 31–15, but then lost his semi-final 33–37 to Reardon, who went on to claim his first title. The tournament recognised as the 1971 World Championship was in fact held in November 1970, and took place in Australia. Following an incomplete round-robin stage, Spencer decisively eliminated Reardon 34–15 in the semi-finals before defeating Warren Simpson 37–29 in the final to regain the title. Spencer made three century breaks in the course of four frames during the final match.

Spencer gained important TV exposure through BBC TV's Pot Black series. He won the tournament in 1970 (reversing his defeat by Reardon in the 1969 final) and again in 1971 when he beat Fred Davis in the final. He claimed the highest break prize in 1972, finished as runner-up in 1974, and won the event again in 1976, becoming the first three-time winner.

Four events sponsored by Park Drive cigarettes—known collectively as the Park Drive 2000—were held in 1971 and 1972. In each event, four invited professionals competed in nine matches and the top two players in the round-robin played a final match. Spencer won three of the events and reached the final of the fourth, narrowly losing 3–4 to Reardon. From 1969 to 1978, only three players were able to defeat Spencer in World Championship matches (Reardon, Higgins and Perrie Mans), and from 1973 to 1977 he did not lose a World Championship match by more than two frames. In 1971, Spencer won the Stratford Professional with a 5–2 victory over David Taylor.

1972 to 1976
The 1972 World Championship final was pivotal in the rise of snooker as one of Britain's most popular sports. As defending champion in the 1972 event, Spencer eliminated Fred Davis 31–21 and Charlton 37–32, before facing championship debutant Alex Higgins in the final. Historian Dominic Sandbrook wrote in 2019 that the final was played under "risibly ramshackle conditions". Spectators at the final were seated on wooden boards placed on beer barrels. There was a miners' strike in progress at the time, with associated power shortages, and without normal power on the first evening of play, the session was conducted with reduced lighting provided by a mobile generator. The week-long final was fairly balanced until the Thursday evening session which Higgins won 6–0, creating a gap that Spencer was never likely to recover from. Higgins proceeded to take the match 37–31.

Spencer made no excuses for his defeat, despite being exhausted and ill from a major tour of Canada, trapped in a lift ahead of one of the sessions, and involved in a minor car crash on the way to another session. He had also expended effort in beating Higgins 4–3 in the final of the Park Drive 2000 event the night before the World Championship final commenced. In his 2005 memoir, Spencer made clear that Higgins had produced the better snooker and had won the match "fair and square". He was also quick to admit that Higgins' win brought in more sponsorship, more promotions, better organisation and more media interest. Later that year, Spencer would also see his Stratford Professional title pass to Higgins, who won 6–3 in the final.

Spencer played down talk of a friendship between himself and Reardon, and stated that they never socialised together. He referred to Reardon as "the sort of person who could laugh 24 hours a day if it was to his advantage." However, the two players paired up for the first two World Doubles Championships. In 1983, they lost 2–6 to Jimmy White and Tony Knowles in the quarter-finals; and in 1984, they lost 0–5 to Cliff Thorburn and John Virgo, also in the quarter-finals. The partnership ended when Spencer realised he would be too ill to play in the 1985 event.

In 1973 and 1974, Norwich Union sponsored a snooker event which contained both professionals and amateur players. Spencer won the event both times it was held, defeating Higgins 8–2 in the semi-finals and Pulman 8–7 in the final to win the 1973 event; and beating Thorburn 9–7 in the semi-finals and Reardon 10–9 in the final to win the 1974 event. His victory in 1974 was more notable given that his cue had been broken into four pieces ten days before the event and he had needed to have it pieced back together. Spencer was runner-up in both inaugural Pontins events, first held in 1974. He lost the Open (conceding 25 points per frame) to Doug Mountjoy 4–7 and the Professional event to Reardon 9–10, after trailing 4–9. He also won the Jackpot Automatics tournament, a minor eight-player invitational in late 1974, defeating Higgins 5–0 in the final.

A sign of growing interest in snooker's resurgence came when Ladbrokes held a gala evening towards the end of 1973 at the Café Royal to celebrate its £8,000 investment into the sport in the 1973–74 season. Spencer took the £150 first prize with a 3–2 win over Ray Edmonds.

Spencer's good form was not to be translated into positive results at the 1973 and 1974 World Championships. He lost by a single frame, 22–23, to Reardon in the 1973 World Championship semi-finals, after leading 16–9 and 19–12. Prior to this, he had shown decisive form in defeating David Taylor 16–5 and Williams 16–7. In 1974, he lost 13–15 to Mans in the second round. Spencer refused to blame the defeat on a dose of flu from which he had been suffering (and he did in fact lose to Mans again in the 1978 event). In the plate competition for first- and second-round losers, he recorded six centuries in the process of defeating David Greaves 5–1, Dennis Taylor 9–4, Jim Meadowcroft 9–3, and Pulman 15–5 in the final.

In January 1975, Spencer won the inaugural Masters event held at Fulham's West Centre Hotel. He defeated Pulman 5–3 and Charlton 5–2, before overcoming Reardon in the closest of finals. In the spring, he won the invitational Ashton Court Country Club event by defeating Higgins 5–1 in front of a sellout crowd in the final, also taking the highest break prize. He lost 2–5 to Higgins in the final of the Castle Open pro-am at the end of the year.

Spencer was eliminated from the 1975 World Championship in a somewhat controversial manner. With the tournament being staged in Australia and organised by Charlton, Spencer found himself in the same half of the draw as both Reardon and Higgins, meaning that all the World Champions since 1969 were in one half of the draw, whilst Charlton was in the other. Furthermore, Spencer was placed 8th in the organisational seedings, which meant that he met Reardon in the quarter-finals. At the time, both players felt that it was the greatest match they had yet played against one another, but despite recording two centuries in the first four frames and leading 17–16, Spencer lost 17–19.

The following year, the 1976 World Championship saw an even narrower defeat for Spencer at the same stage. Having defeated David Taylor 15–5, and making the highest break of the tournament, 138, in the process, he lost to Higgins in the quarter-finals 14–15, having trailed 12–14. He won the 1976 Canadian Open that year, defeating Virgo 9–4 in the semi-finals and Higgins 17–9 in the final to claim the $5,000 prize.

Final World Championship victory and other titles 
Spencer won his third world title at the Crucible Theatre in 1977, the first World Snooker Championship to be held at the new venue. Seeded 8th, he defeated Virgo 13–9 (having trailed 1–4), Reardon 13–6, Pulman 18–16, and Thorburn 25–21 (having trailed 11–15) in the final, claiming the winner's prize of £6,000. He followed this up by winning the Pontins Professional title a week later, defeating Pulman 7–5 in the final. Spencer's victory at the 1977 World Championship was the last time he seriously challenged for the world title as he never again progressed beyond the last-16 stage of the tournament.

He again reached the final of the Canadian Open in 1977, where he lost to Higgins 14–17. The tournament was played inside a "big top" circus tent, alongside a traditional circus setup. The conditions were so hot that Spencer's chalk snapped in half when he tried using it, due to an accumulation of moisture inside his breast pocket.

In the spring of 1978, he won the inaugural Irish Masters at Goffs Sales Room in County Kildare, beating Doug Mountjoy 5–3 in the final. Spencer was undefeated in the group stages of the 1978 Pontins Professional tournament, winning all five of his matches, before losing 2–7 to Reardon in the final.

Spencer warmed up for the 1978 World Championship by winning the Castle Professional event, defeating Higgins 5–3 in the final.  However, he lost his opening match in the World Championship to Mans by 8–13, despite earlier making a break of 118 to put him in a 3–1 lead. He began the final session with a 138 break, which later proved to be the highest of the championship, but he then failed to win another frame. The high break prize doubled Spencer's prize earnings from the event to £1,000.

First unofficial 147 break in a tournament
In January 1979, at the Holsten Lager International, Spencer completed the first ever 147 maximum break in tournament play. He was playing Thorburn in the quarter-finals and, having already taken the first three frames of the match, he compiled a maximum in the fourth. When lining up for the final black, he surprised the audience by lunging forward and hitting over the cue ball in his initial address, before potting the black. Thames Television were resting their TV crew at the time following the previous match between Higgins and David Taylor, so the historic moment was not captured by the TV cameras. Spencer's 147 did not count as an official maximum break as the event used tables that did not have their  checked using official templates, so it remains unofficial. He went on to win the tournament, beating Williams 6–2 in the semi-finals and Graham Miles 11–7 in the final. As well as his £3,500 first prize, the sponsors awarded Spencer an additional £500 for the unofficial maximum. Three years later, on 11 January 1982, Spencer was Steve Davis's opponent when Davis made the first televised 147 break at the Lada Classic tournament in Oldham's Queen Elizabeth Hall. This occurred in the fifth frame of their quarter-final match when the scores had been poised at two frames each.

Two months after Spencer's unofficial 147, he won the Garware Paints Invitational event in Bombay, the biggest tournament that India had yet staged. He beat India's Arvind Savur 6–1, Patsy Fagan 6–4, Miles 6–5 and Thorburn 6–3 to take the £2,000 first prize and another £200 for the highest break (108), also claiming the 'Man of the Series' award.

Spencer reached the semi-finals of the Irish Masters in 1979, losing 2–3 to Reardon, after making the highest break of the tournament (121) at the group stage. He was also runner-up to Reardon in the 1979 Forward Chemicals Tournament. In the final of this extended event, which used the old Park Drive 2000 format, Spencer lost 6–9.

In January 1980, Spencer won £3,000 (a record for a two-day event) at the Wilson's Classic. Broadcast by Granada TV, the final contained a  incident declared by the referee against Spencer's opponent Higgins. Higgins received a £200 fine for his reaction to Jim Thorpe's controversial decision. Spencer also won the Winfield Australian Masters in 1980, beating Dennis Taylor in the final.

Spencer's 10–9 first-round victory over Edmonds at the 1981 World Championship was his first win at the tournament since claiming the title in 1977. He faced Reardon in the second round, but lost the match 11–13 after leading 3–0 and 7–5. This was to be the last time the two players would meet in the World Championship. Spencer, Steve Davis and David Taylor became the first English team to win the World Cup, in 1981. Spencer crucially defeated Terry Griffiths with the aid of a 103 break, Griffiths having not lost a single match up to that stage in the competition. Davis then secured victory against Reardon in the tie-break to win the title and prize money of £12,000.

Prior to the 1982 World Championship, Spencer beat Higgins (who won the world title a few weeks later) 6–0 in the semi-final of the 1982 Highland Masters in Inverness, before losing 4–11 to Reardon in the final. Spencer took the highest break prize with an effort of 119. The World Championship produced a great many upsets and the loss of the top three seeds in round one. Despite a strong performance in beating John Dunning 10–4 in the first round, Spencer was unable to take advantage of the more open draw. After holding Willie Thorne to 3–3 in round two, Spencer's form deteriorated and he lost the match 5–13.

At the end of 1982, Spencer finally won a match in the UK Championship, having lost his first match every year since the inaugural tournament in 1977. After defeating Charlton 9–8, Spencer followed this up by eliminating Knowles 9–6, before losing to Higgins 5–9 in the quarter-finals.

In 1983, Spencer defeated Reardon 5–3 and David Taylor 5–2 in the Lada Classic, which guaranteed him a cheque for £6,000 (the same as he had received for winning the 1977 World Championship). In the semi-finals, he led Steve Davis 3–1, then 4–2, and by 45–29 in the deciding frame, but Davis clinched the match. At the 1983 World Championship, Spencer beat Mike Hallett 10–7 in the first round, before facing Charlton in the second. Spencer moved into a 4–0 lead but lost his intensity, and despite a break of 106 he allowed Charlton to move 12–7 ahead. Spencer fought back and was on the verge of levelling at 12–12 but went  and lost the match 11–13.

Illness 
Spencer's later career was blighted by the ocular version of myasthenia gravis, with symptoms including double vision. He first noticed something was amiss when he felt unwell at the Pontin's Professional tournament in 1984. He later wrote that when the news broke in the press about his condition, only two players sent personal messages to him; one was Thorburn, the other Higgins, who turned up at Spencer's house with a bottle of Bacardi rum but drank it himself as Spencer was not allowed alcohol at this point.

He failed to secure the 1984 Pontins Professional title, losing 7–9 to Willie Thorne in the final. During the 1984 World Championship, he had defeated Miles 10–3 in the first round and held top seed Steve Davis to 4–6 in round two, before Davis pulled ahead and won 13–5. The Miles match was Spencer's last victory at the Crucible.

He won only one ranking match during the 1984–85 season, when he  Frank Jonik 6–0 in the Dulux British Open. He narrowly lost in the 1984 Pot Black final to Griffiths. Spencer's condition made him susceptible to eye strain under bright TV lighting; when he competed in the 1985 Pontins Professional event under ordinary shaded lighting he once again reached the final, losing 7–9 to Griffiths. It proved to be his last notable tournament final.

Ahead of the 1986 World Championship, Spencer journeyed to Scotland for some concentrated practice, which paid off when he qualified for the Crucible to play Higgins in the first round. Higgins led 8–2 and eventually won by a reduced margin at 10–7. It was to be Spencer's last visit to the Crucible as a participant in the World Championship. Gordon Burn relates that part of Spencer's Scottish practice involved playing a young Stephen Hendry. After two money-match defeats, Spencer had suggested to Hendry that they play the next match in casual clothes, to which Hendry agreed, with the result that Spencer won their third encounter 6–4.

Spencer fell to a career-low 34th in the rankings for the 1986–87 season. He made a break of 129 in defeating Terry Whitthread 5–2 at the 1987 British Open a month later. In the final stages of this event, he defeated then World Champion Joe Johnson 5–3 en route to the quarter-finals. In his last-eight match against White, he compiled a century, and captured the sixth frame after needing six snookers. He achieved a 5–0 victory over Fred Davis in the 1988 British Open, followed by a 5–0 win over Dennis Taylor, but lost 4–5 in the fifth round to Williams.

Retirement and final years
Spencer used steroids to reduce the symptoms of his illness, but the effectiveness of this treatment was inconsistent. In the 1990 World Championship qualifiers, he eliminated Ken Owers 10–8, before providing a tough test for rising star James Wattana, who won the penultimate frame on the final black and the last frame on the pink to seal a 10–8 victory in the fourth qualifying round. In the 1991 World Championship, Spencer lost his first qualifying match to Ray Edmonds 4–10, giving Edmonds a long-awaited victory over Spencer in a rivalry that stretched back to the 1965 English Amateur Championship. Spencer indicated a strong desire to carry on playing into the next season and stated that he was planning to enter all of the events on the calendar.

Due to a flare-up of his condition in June, Spencer was too ill to play in the first six events of the 1991–92 season. He kept his playing hopes alive by joining the management group of Six Colours Promotions in February 1992, hoping that this might provide a much-needed 'morale boost'. Also involved was then-World Champion John Parrott, whom Spencer had advised ahead of his 1991 World Championship win. When Spencer played in the four remaining events of the season, he was only able to win a single frame (against Euan Henderson in the British Open). In his final World Championship appearance in 1992, he scored just 207 points against Bjorn L'Orange in the second round of qualifying and lost the match 0–10. Spencer retired from professional play that year.

Spencer continued to do some exhibitions and wrote in his 2005 autobiography that he was grateful to Stephen Hendry's manager, Ian Doyle, for arranging some exhibitions after Spencer had stepped down as chairman of the WPBSA. Soon after this, he began to have trouble with veins in his legs, making mobility an issue. He took part in Seniors Pot Black in 1997 and lost to Dennis Taylor. He later wrote that he was suffering from severe depression caused by his illness when he played this match.

Playing style and legacy 
Spencer and Reardon were the two players that dominated professional snooker in the 1970s. Spencer's cue action included an unusually long backswing which gave him immense , and allowed him to develop shots using deep  from long-distance and maximum . Everton wrote that in his early career, Spencer "had an attractive, attacking style based on long potting, prodigious screw shots... and the kind of confidence usually seen only in a much younger man." Williams and Gadsby commented that Spencer was distinctive for his "immense zest for the sport and his perfection of a stroke few could master – the deep screw shot", and "fine judgement of lethal long-range pots, a tactic... considered fairly risky at the time and nothing like as common as it is today." His obituarist in the Daily Telegraph wrote that despite Spencer's cue power, "his unflappable temperament was perhaps his greatest asset."

As one of the first major professional snooker players to use a two-piece cue, Spencer was the first to win the World Championship (in 1977) with a two-piece. The cue was given to him by Al Selinger of the Dufferin Cue Company during Spencer's victorious run in the 1976 Canadian Open. He did not make immediate use of the cue but switched to it a few weeks before competing in the 1977 World Championship. A few months later he changed his cue again to another two-piece, this time from Japan.

Personal life and non-playing career
In 1973, Cassell published Spencer on Snooker, an instructional book written by Spencer in which he also gave his opinions about the strengths and weaknesses of other leading professional snooker players. A revised version, edited by Everton, was published in 1986 as Snooker in the Teach Yourself series. Spencer featured in a televised pro-am golf show in 1980, and guested on the quiz show Pot the Question on BBC1 in 1984. He appeared on the snooker-themed show Big Break in 1991, 1992 and 1997.

Following his defeat by Mans in the 1978 World Championship, Spencer was invited by producer Nick Hunter to try his hand at commentating on snooker for BBC television, a task he enjoyed for the next 19 years.

In 1985, he opened a snooker club in Bolton called "Spencer's", and opened another club in the city the following year. He and his wife Margot agreed to separate in 1987, after 18 years of marriage. Poor health led to Spencer's departure from the role of commentator in 1998. In his memoirs, he wrote of struggling through the role before retiring back to his hotel room. He also related that he was deeply moved by the kindness of fellow commentators Ted Lowe and Edmonds. He was also chairman of the WPBSA for seven years to 1996, despite periods of extreme ill health. When he resigned from his position in November 1996, he had been a member of the governing board for 25 years.

In early 2003, Spencer was diagnosed with stomach cancer but he refused chemotherapy, choosing to enjoy the rest of his life without the effects of the treatment. He attended the Crucible in May 2005 for the Parade of Champions, which took place before the final session of the 2005 World Championship final. Despite his illness, he took part in a sponsored parachute jump in 2005. His biography Out of the Blue – Into the Black was published that same year. In his review of the book, Everton concluded by writing "After a long spell of obscurity, Snooker needed new heroes and in that small cast he was at the forefront. He has an honourable place in Snooker's history."

Spencer died on 11 July 2006 in a hospice in Bolton at the age of 70 from the effects of his stomach cancer. He was survived by his partner Jean Sheffield.

Performance and rankings timeline

Career finals

Ranking finals: 1 (1 title)

Non-ranking finals: 45 (26 titles)

Pro-am finals: 3 (1 title)

Team finals: 3 (1 title)

Amateur finals: 4 (1 title)

Notes

References
Books

Citations

External links

Obituary on the BBC News website

English snooker players
Masters (snooker) champions
Snooker writers and broadcasters
British sports broadcasters
People from Radcliffe, Greater Manchester
Deaths from stomach cancer
1935 births
2006 deaths
Deaths from cancer in England
Winners of the professional snooker world championship
People educated at Stand Grammar School